

Belgium
 Belgian Congo – Auguste Tilkens, Governor-General of the Belgian Congo (1927–1934)

France
 French Somaliland – Pierre Aimable Chapon-Baissac, Governor of French Somaliland (1924–1932)
 Guinea – Louis François Antonin, acting Lieutenant-Governor of Guinea (1929–1931)

Japan
 Karafuto – Shinobu Agata, Governor-General of Karafuto (9 July 1929 – 17 December 1931)
 Korea – Saitō Makoto, Governor-General of Korea (1929–1931)
 Taiwan – Ishizuka Eizō, Governor-General of Taiwan (30 July 1929 – January 1931)

Portugal
 Angola –
 Filomeno da Câmara Melo Cabral, High Commissioner of Angola (1929–1930)
 José Dionísio Carneiro de Sousa e Faro, High Commissioner of Angola (1930–1931)

United Kingdom
 Malta Colony – John Philip Du Cane, Governor of Malta (1927–1931)
 Northern Rhodesia – Sir James Crawford Maxwell, Governor of Northern Rhodesia (1927–1932)

Notes

Colonial governors
Colonial governors
1930